Igor Vitalyevich Simutenkov (born 3 April 1973 in Moscow) is a Russian football coach and a former player. Currently, he works as assistant manager at FC Zenit Saint Petersburg.

Club career 

Simutenkov started his pro career in the old Soviet league with Dynamo Moscow in 1990. He spent the next five years with Dynamo, the last three in the Russian league, which he led in scoring with 21 goals in 1994. A transfer to Serie A's Reggiana followed, and Simutenkov spent the next five seasons in Italy (the last with Bologna), scoring a total of only 23 goals.

In 1999, Simutenkov transferred to Spanish club Tenerife, and spent three uneventful seasons there. He signed with the Kansas City Wizards in 2002, becoming Major League Soccer's first Russian player. Igor scored four goals in his first season (plus one in playoffs), seven in his second (plus two in playoffs), before missing a big chunk of the third with an injury, ending with a solitary goal in league play. He scored the golden goal in the final of the 2004 Lamar Hunt U.S. Open Cup, but was released by the Wizards following the 2004 season, at which time he returned to Russia and signed with Rubin.

At the end of season 2005, while made only 3 appearances for Rubin, Simutenkov declared his retirement from professional football. He told that he couldn't perform at the high level because of a few serious permanent injuries. However, in 2006 he was included in the squad of FC Dynamo Voronezh, a Second Division side.

Simutenkov is also known for the famous Simutenkov-case in which the European Court of Justice acknowledged the direct effect of the partnership-agreement between the European Communities and Russia. In this judgment Spanish nationality-clauses for non-EU footballers were found in breach with Community law.

International career 

Simutenkov has scored nine goals in 20 caps for the Russian national team, playing in Euro 96, but his last appearance came in 1998.

He was part of the Russia squad that won the 2009 Legends Cup.

Coaching career 
In 2007, he managed a Russian Second Division team FC Torpedo-RG. From 2007 till the end of 2009 he was a coach of Russia 1993-born youth team. On December 18, 2009, he was appointed an assistant coach at FC Zenit Saint Petersburg with Luciano Spalletti as the head coach.

Playing career statistics 

* – played games and goals

International goals

Individual honours
 1994 – Russia's best football player

References

External links
 Igor Simutenkov on RSSSF
 Player profile 
 Igor Simutenkov on FC Zenit Saint-Petersburg web site

1973 births
Living people
Soviet footballers
Soviet Union under-21 international footballers
Russian footballers
Sporting Kansas City players
FC Dynamo Moscow players
A.C. Reggiana 1919 players
Bologna F.C. 1909 players
CD Tenerife players
FC Rubin Kazan players
UEFA Euro 1996 players
Footballers from Moscow
Soviet Top League players
Russian Premier League players
Serie A players
Serie B players
La Liga players
Segunda División players
Major League Soccer players
Russia international footballers
Russia under-21 international footballers
Russian expatriate footballers
Expatriate footballers in Italy
Expatriate footballers in Spain
Expatriate soccer players in the United States
Russian expatriate sportspeople in Italy
Russian expatriate sportspeople in Spain
Russian expatriate sportspeople in the United States
Russian football managers
FC Zenit Saint Petersburg non-playing staff
Association football forwards